The United Kingdom, known in philatelic circles as "Great Britain", released many commemorative stamps (postage stamps issued to honour or commemorate a place, event or person) in the 1970s.

History
Postage stamps were first issued in the United Kingdom on 6 May 1840, with the introduction of the world's first adhesive postage stamp, known as the Penny Black. Until 1924, all British stamps depicted only the portrait of the reigning monarch, with the exception of the "high value" stamps (also known as the "Sea Horses" design) issued in 1913, which were twice the size of normal stamps with added pictorial design.

In 1924, the first "commemorative" stamp was issued for the British Empire Exhibition. There were then occasional issues over the next thirty years, when the frequency of new issues became more regular. From the mid-1960s, in most years, six to nine sets of commemorative stamps have been issued every year. PHQ cards, postcard-sized reproductions of commemorative stamps, have also been issued to accompany every new set of stamps since the mid-1970s.

Other decades
 United Kingdom commemorative stamps 1924–1969
 United Kingdom commemorative stamps 1980–1989
 United Kingdom commemorative stamps 1990–1999
 United Kingdom commemorative stamps 2000–2009
 United Kingdom commemorative stamps 2010–2019
 United Kingdom commemorative stamps 2020–2029

Acknowledgments

 Stanley Gibbons
 Concise Stamp Catalogue
 Gibbons Stamp Monthly
 Royal Mail Stamp Guide
 Royal Mail British Philatelic Bulletin

See also

 Stanley Gibbons
 Stamp Collecting
 List of people on stamps
 Philately
 stamps
 PHQ Cards

References

External links
 Stanley Gibbons Stamps Shop Homepage
 Royal Mail

1970
Commemorative stamps
Lists of postage stamps
Commemorative
Commemorative stamps